Arnheim is a surname. Notable people with the surname include:

 Edith Arnheim (1884–1964), Swedish tennis player
 Fritz Arnheim (1866–1922), German historian
 Gus Arnheim (1897–1955), American band leader
 Michael Arnheim (born 1944), German-English barrister and author
 Rudolf Arnheim (1904–2007), German American author
 Walter Arnheim (born 10 October 1944), American businessman and non-profit manager

Fictional characters:
 Paul Arnheim, character in the novel The Man Without Qualities by Robert Musil

See also 
Arnheim (disambiguation)